The following is an episode list for Still Game. The first series began on 6 September 2002 and its ninth and final series ended on 28 March 2019.

In the first three series the episode titles were all Scots words that were related to the episode. This was changed to standard English titles for Series 4, so that the rest of UK audience could understand the titles.

Series overview

Episode list

Series 1 (2002)

Early series of the show featured short sound clips whenever an exterior shot of Osprey Heights (the building Jack, Victor, and Isa live in) occurred. These included Jack and Victor sighing contentedly and one of the two saying "Is that you?" with the other replying "Oh, aye, that's me." Arguably the most common featured Jack and Victor humming a song ("Hurdy gurdy gurdy, in the windae boxes"). These decreased in frequency after the first couple of series, and were discontinued altogether by the fourth series.

Series 2 (2003)
{| class="wikitable" style="width:100%;"
|-
! style="background:#fbec5d; width:10%;"|Overall
! style="background:#fbec5d; width:10%;"|No. in series
! style="background:#fbec5d; width:40%;"|Title
! style="background:#fbec5d; width:40%;"|Writers
! style="background:#fbec5d; width:40%;"|Air date
! style="background:#fbec5d; width:40%;"|
{{Episode list
| EpisodeNumber   = 7
| EpisodeNumber2  = 1
| Title           = Gairden
| WrittenBy= Ford Kiernan and Greg Hemphill
| OriginalAirDate = 
|Viewers=2.88
| ShortSummary    = The residents of Craiglang are being terrorised by the local neds, but the pensioners have had enough and decide to make their own haven they can escape to. Meanwhile, Jack and Victor check on old Ronnie, who has been recently committed to a sanatorium after being found dancing in George Square in his underwear.

Guest Starring: John Shedden, Gary Sweeney, and James Young'| LineColor       = FBEC5D
}}

|}

Series 3 (2004)

Series 4 (2005)

Christmas Special (2005)

Series 5 (2006)  

Hogmanay Special (2006)

Series 6 (2007) 

Christmas Special (2007)

Hogmanay Special (2007)

Live at the Hydro (2014)

Children In Need Special (2014)

The Story So Far (2014)

Series 7 (2016)
On 12 May 2016, Ford and Greg announced a new series of Still Game was in the works. Filming of the long-awaited seventh series commenced on 4 July 2016, with the series airing in late 2016 on BBC One nationwide. All of the original main cast reprised their roles. Recurring character Pete "The Jakey" McCormack, played by Jake D'Arcy, who died in May 2015, did not return; and the character's death was announced in the second episode, "The Undrinkables."

Series 8 (2018)
The eighth series of Still Game'' aired from 8 March to 12 April 2018, in Wales it aired on BBC Two only

Series 9 (2019)
The ninth series was broadcast from February to March 2019 on the new BBC Scotland channel. Ford Kiernan and Greg Hemphill stated this will be the final series.
Filming on the ninth series began in August 2018.

That's Plenty (2019)

Notes

References

External links
 
 

BBC-related lists
Lists of British sitcom episodes
Episodes